Harvey C. Smith (July 7, 1874 – May 26, 1929) was a Republican politician in the U.S. state of Ohio who served as Ohio Secretary of State 1919-1923.

Biography

Harvey C. Smith was born in Coshocton County, Ohio and moved to Muskingum County, Ohio in childhood. He was a schoolteacher and newspaper publisher before being elected to three terms as Muskingum County Probate Judge, where he earned a statewide reputation. He was elected Ohio Secretary of State in 1918, and re-elected in 1920.

Harvey C. Smith married Cora E. Littick and had one son, Clyde. He died in 1929 in Columbus, Ohio, and is buried in Woodlawn Cemetery, Zanesville, Ohio.

References

Secretaries of State of Ohio
Ohio Republicans
People from Muskingum County, Ohio
Ohio lawyers
1874 births
1929 deaths
People from Coshocton County, Ohio
19th-century American lawyers